Big Brother Albania 8 was the eighth season of the Albanian television series of the worldwide franchise of Big Brother. The premiere for this season was 7 March 2015. The main topic of this season is the host Arbana Osmani will not return for another season due to pregnancy. The main host will be Ledion Liço, while Albana Osmani hosted the Sunday morning show, featuring dialogues with eliminated contestants and fans of the show. The show ran for 99 days and the winner was Vesel Kurtishaj. He received a €100,000 prize.

Housemates

Nominations table 
This season followed the same twist as Big Brother 11 (Australia), in which housemates were paired and together they had to nominate and be evicted.

 Nominated forever

Notes 

 : Although her pair was walked, Zaida continued to be the Head of House. On Day 8, Sokol was also ejected. Because of this, Zaida and Xhensila were left without pair and had the option to become a new pair. They accepted it.
 : Similar to Big Brother Australia, each pair had to distribute 5 points between 2 other pairs. However, housemates up for eviction have individual numbers and not with their pairs.
 : Stilian and Kreshnik were automatically nominated as a result of breaking the rules.
 : While his pair was evicted, Big Brother decided to send Stilian to a Secret Room. The other housemates think he was evicted too.
 : This week there were no nominations, and Alba, Diedon, Genci and Tea were automatically nominated. They were nominated because of their behaviour during the week and being involved on Kika's ejection, having provoked him to have bad behaviour and being ejected.
 : Similar to Big Brother Australia, each housemate had to distribute 5 points between 2 other housemates.
 : All the female housemates and Fisnik were automatically nominated. Fisnik was automatically nominated because his group failed the week task, so the other group had to nominate one of the other (Diedon, Eleonora, Fisnik or Stilian). All the girls were automatically nominated because there's more girls in the house than guys, and a guy was already nominated.
 : This week there was a twist, in which the housemates were divided in groups for the weekly last and whoever had the most points would see its group facing eviction. Zaida received the most points, therefore Eleonora, Diedon, Fabian, Kristi, Marsuela and Xhenaila are up for eviction as well.
 : In a double eviction night, all housemates were nominated for the second round. The one with the most votes was evicted.
 : As Milena entered on Day 50, Big Brother decided that she is nominates for the whole season.
 : Whoever had at least 2 points in this nominations was nominated. As everyone had at least 2 points, Big Brother announced everyone was nominated this week.
 : Alba and Kristi won immunity in the weekly task. All the other housemates were nominated for eviction.
 : Fatjon and Fisnik were automatically nominated due to rule breaking.
 : This week, whoever had at least 5 points was nominated.
 : The public voted to win rather than to evict.

References

External links
 Official Website

2015 Albanian television seasons
08